The 1935 European Figure Skating Championships were held in St. Moritz, Switzerland from January 23 to 26. Elite senior-level figure skaters competed for the title of European Champion in the disciplines of men's singles, ladies' singles, and pair skating.

Results

Men

Judges were
 L. von Orbán 
 Artur Vieregg 
 K. Dundas 
 A. Huber 
 Josef Fellner 
 Freddy Mésot 
 Charles Sabouret

Ladies

Judges were
 H. Martineau 
 Charles Sabouret 
 H. Günauer 
 Z. Johansen 
 K. Dannenberg 
 Freddy Mésot 
 L. von Orbán

Pairs

Judges were
 Freddy Mésot 
 L. von Orbán 
 Artur Vieregg 
 W. Bayerle 
 L. Liebermann 
 Charles Sabouret 
 K. M. Beaumont

References

Sources
 Result List provided by the ISU

European Figure Skating Championships
European Figure Skating Championships, 1935
European Figure Skating Championships, 1935
Figure skating in Switzerland
International figure skating competitions hosted by Switzerland